Carbon tech is a group of existing and emerging technologies that are rapidly transforming oil and gas to low emissions energy. Combined, these technologies take a circular carbon economy approach for managing and reducing carbon footprints, while optimizing biological and industry processes. It builds on the principles of the circular economy for managing carbon emissions: to reduce the amount of carbon emissions entering the atmosphere, to reuse carbon emissions as a feedstock in different industries, to recycle carbon through the natural carbon cycle with bioenergy, and to remove carbon and store it. Carbon tech provides a third option for climate and environmental policy as an alternate to the binary business as usual and radical change.

Carbon management can be achieved through nature-based solutions such as reforestation and afforestation, or through technological strategies. Technologies available range from Carbon Capture, Utilization and Storage (CCUS), to negative emissions technologies such as bioenergy with carbon capture and storage, direct air carbon capture, as well as enhanced weathering, biofuels, and biochar from waste that exists in today's processes.

Principles
The circular carbon economy is a closed loop system that encompasses​​ 4Rs - Reduce, Reuse, Recycle, and Remove and applies them to managing carbon emissions.

Reduce
Energy efficiency, flaring minimization, modern SCADA controls, artificial intelligence, and making consumer products greener are among the strategies used to control the anthropogenic release of carbon emissions. It is complementary to opportunities to reduce fossil fuel use through substitution with low-carbon energy sources like nuclear, hydropower, bioenergy, and non-carbon emitting renewables.

Reuse
Carbon can be reused by pooling  streams for energy generation, in waste management and product manufacturing. It can be reused in fuels, enhanced oil recovery, chemicals, bioenergy, food and beverages.

 can be reused in building materials and provides a form of long-term  storage.

Recycle
CO₂ can be chemically transformed through organic chemistry into different products such as fertilizers, cement, biofuels, vodka, carbon nanotubes, material coatings, plastics, methanol, diamonds, clothing, foam, and detergents.

CO₂ is also transformed into other forms of energy like synthetic fuels. Synthetic hydrocarbon fuels are of importance in the aviation industry due to few low-carbon alternatives available.

Remove
Carbon emissions are captured both at the combustion stage and directly from the atmosphere, then stored into deep underground geological formations. Examples are capturing CO₂ from coal and natural gas power plants, hydrocarbon fuels, and heavy industries such as steel and cement manufacturing.

Planting flora, such as mangroves, also contributes toward reduction by increasing photosynthesis. Mangrove trees are among the largest stores of blue carbon.

Carbon tech globally
The IEA estimates that energy efficiency measures are projected to represent over 40% of the emissions abatement needed by 2040 to be in line with the Paris Agreement. IRENA concludes that renewable energy and energy efficiency measures can potentially deliver more than 90% of the carbon emission cuts needed under the Paris Agreement.

According to the U.N.’s Intergovernmental Panel on Climate Change, carbon tech solutions will capture almost as many emissions as renewables will reduce by the end of the century. The IEA also notes that when oil and gas are produced through enhanced oil recovery, the full lifecycle emissions intensity can be neutral or even carbon-negative.

According to a new report by research and consultancy firm Wood Mackenzie, Canada is a leader in carbon tech with projects underway that could reduce Canada's greenhouse gas emissions by up to 60% of their 2030 goal.

References

Carbon
Climate engineering
Carbon capture and storage